Huntingtower Community Primary Academy (formerly Huntingtower Road Primary School) is a non-denominational, mixed primary academy in Grantham, South Kesteven, Lincolnshire. Opened in 1914, the school, located on Huntingtower Road, educates 388 pupils, aged 4 to 11. It gained academy status in 2013. The school curriculum was rated good in the 2016 Ofsted inspection.

Former Prime Minister Margaret Thatcher was a pupil at the school between 1930 and 1936, before winning a scholarship to attend the local grammar school, Kesteven and Grantham Girls' School.

References

External links

Primary schools in Lincolnshire
Academies in Lincolnshire
1914 establishments in England
Schools in Grantham
Educational institutions established in 1914